Adam Ciaran Brown (born 25 September 1987 in Newport, Wales) is a Welsh rugby union player.

A lock, he played for the Newport Gwent Dragons having progressed through the Dragons Academy. He made his debut for the Dragons on 15 February 2008 against Ulster.

Brown has represented the Wales national rugby union team at Under-19 and Under 20 levels. He previously played for Newport RFC, Pontypool United RFC and Bedwas RFC.

He was released by the Newport Gwent Dragons at the end of the 2010–11 Magners League and joined London Welsh.

After being released by London Welsh, he returned to Wales to join Newport RFC

References

External links
Newport Gwent Dragons profile

Welsh rugby union players
Dragons RFC players
London Welsh RFC players
Living people
Rugby union players from Newport, Wales
1987 births
Rugby union locks